The Zurich armorial (German: Zürcher Wappenrolle) is a roll of arms made in c. 1340 presumably in what is now eastern Switzerland (in or nearby of what is now the canton of St Gallen); it is now kept in the Swiss National Museum in Zurich.

The document was owned by Zurich naturalist and historian Johann Jakob Scheuchzer (1672–1733). Its previous history is unknown. It was given to the Zurich city library by Scheuchzer's nephew in 1750.

The Zurich armorial is one of the oldest and most important surviving collection of arms of the lower nobility of the Holy Roman Empire. Its geographical focus is that of greater Swabia, including the Lake Constance area, German-speaking Switzerland, Elsass, and Baden.

It consisted of four parchment strips each of a width of 12.5 cm and a combined length of four meters. One of the four parts was lost; on the surviving three parchment strips, a total of 559 coats of arms and 28 flags of bishoprics are depicted. A further 108 coats of arms depicted on the lost portion survive in manuscript copies, including one in the library of the counts of Königsegg-Aulendorf and one made by Hans Conrad Bernhauser (1698–1761) kept in Zurich Central Library.

References 

 
 facsimile edition by Heinrich Runge (1860)
 Digitalized at e-codices

See also 

 Heraldry of the Holy Roman Empire

Rolls of arms
Heraldry of the Holy Roman Empire
Medieval Switzerland
14th-century manuscripts
Illuminated heraldic manuscripts